Trayvon Palmer (born November 13, 1994) is an American professional basketball player for the Motor City Cruise of the NBA G League. He played college basketball for the North Dakota State College of Science (NDSCS) and Chicago State University.

College career
Palmer played one season of junior college basketball for NDSCS, averaging 13.3 points and 10.1 rebounds per game in the 2013–14 season. He then transferred to NCAA Division I Chicago State. He averaged 9.5 points and 7.8 rebounds per game as a junior. As a senior, Palmer averaged 15.1 points and 9.4 rebounds per game and earned Chicago State's Student-Athlete of the Year honors.

Professional career

Worcester Wolves (2017–2018)
Palmer began his professional career in 2017 with the Worcester Wolves of the British Basketball League. After a year in England, in which he averaged 14.6 points, 6.0 rebounds and 2.8 assists per game, he returned to the United States.

Santa Cruz Warriors (2018)
Palmer joined the NBA G League, signing with the Santa Cruz Warriors on November 28, 2018.

Northern Arizona Suns / Motor City Cruise (2018–2021)
After averaging 8.5 points and 5.5 rebounds per game in two games, he was acquired by the Northern Arizona Suns in December 2018. Palmer moved with the team to Detroit as the team became the Motor City Cruise in 2021. He averaged 11.1 points and six rebounds per game for the Cruise.

Detroit Pistons (2021–2022)
On December 28, 2021, Palmer was signed to a 10-day contract by the Detroit Pistons of the NBA under league hardship exceptions concerning COVID-19. He made his NBA debut the following day in a 94-85 loss to the New York Knicks, grabbing two rebounds.

Return to the Cruise (2022–present)
On January 3, 2022, Palmer was reassigned to the Motor City Cruise. He then was placed there at the expiration of his 10-day contract.

Career statistics

NBA

|-
| style="text-align:left;"| 
| style="text-align:left;"| Detroit
| 1 || 0 || 17.0 || .000 || — || — || 2.0 || .0 || .0 || .0 || .0
|- class="sortbottom"
| style="text-align:center;" colspan="2"| Career
| 1 || 0 || 17.0 || .000 || — || — || 2.0 || .0 || .0 || .0 || .0

References

External links
Chicago State Cougars bio
College stats @ sports-reference.com

1994 births
Living people
American expatriate basketball people in the United Kingdom
American men's basketball players
Basketball players from Milwaukee
Chicago State Cougars men's basketball players
Detroit Pistons players
Junior college men's basketball players in the United States
Motor City Cruise players
North Dakota State College of Science alumni
Northern Arizona Suns players
Santa Cruz Warriors players
Shooting guards
Undrafted National Basketball Association players
Worcester Wolves players